Cyril Mennegun (born 26 March 1975) is a French film director and screenwriter. His film Louise Wimmer received the César Award for Best First Feature Film in 2013.

Filmography

References

External links
 

1975 births
Living people
French film directors
French male screenwriters
French screenwriters
Place of birth missing (living people)
People from Belfort